Paradorn Srichaphan was the defending champion, but lost in the quarterfinals this year.

Richard Gasquet won the title, defeating Max Mirnyi 6–2, 6–3 in the final.

Seeds

  Ivan Ljubičić (second round)
  Thomas Johansson (quarterfinals)
  Dominik Hrbatý (second round)
  Richard Gasquet (champion)
  Taylor Dent (semifinals)
  Paradorn Srichaphan (quarterfinals)
  Olivier Rochus (semifinals)
  Max Mirnyi (final)

Draw

Finals

Top half

Bottom half

External links
 Main draw
 Qualifying draw

Nottingham Open
2005 ATP Tour
2005 Nottingham Open